Karl Peter Andersson (born April 13, 1991) is a Swedish professional ice hockey defenceman, currently playing for Lahti Pelicans in the Finnish Liiga. At the 2009 NHL Entry Draft Andersson was drafted by the Vancouver Canucks in the fifth round, 143rd overall.

Playing career
On June 2, 2010, Andersson signed an entry level contract with the Vancouver Canucks.

During the final year of his contract with the Canucks, in the 2014–15 season while with American Hockey League affiliate, the Utica Comets, Andersson was announced to have signed a one-year contract to return to Sweden with Örebro HK on March 25, 2015. Andersson remained with the Comets for the remainder of the campaign, helping the club reach the Calder Cup finals.

After his second season in his return to the SHL with Örebro HK, Andersson was signed to a two-year contract with contending club, Växjö Lakers, on May 31, 2017.

International play

Andersson played for Sweden at the 2010 World Junior Championships held in Saskatchewan, Canada, winning a bronze medal against Switzerland.

Career statistics

Regular season and playoffs

International

Awards and honours

References

External links
 

1991 births
Living people
Borås HC players
Chicago Wolves players
Frölunda HC players
Lahti Pelicans players
Örebro HK players
Swedish ice hockey defencemen
Utica Comets players
Växjö Lakers players
Vancouver Canucks draft picks